The Association of German Transport Companies is the umbrella organization of organizations of transit authorities and other public transport companies. The membership fluctuates in the range of about 600 transport companies. It is a member of the International Association of Public Transport.

The current organization  (VdV) was founded in 1991 with its headquarters in Cologne.

With the Nazi Gleichschaltung its functions were integrated into the Reich Ministry of Transport requiring a new start after World War II.

The association is not only an interest group but it serves as a standards organization within Germany. Its first project in post-war times was to settle on a tramway model that could quickly replace the demolished vehicle fleet throughout. Duewag was contracted to refurbish various tram chassis with a standard body in the range of 355 motor cars and 248 trailer cars from 1948 to 1950. The next generation tram type was named  (association car [type]) with 206 motor cars and 326 trailer cars produced from 1951 to 1958.

During the 1960s bus transport seemed to be more feasible than tram transport so that the association mandated the design of a new standard city bus with multiple generations produced by various manufacturers from 1968 to the mid of the 1980s. Starting in the mid-1980s a new series of buses is recommended.

References 

https://www.vdv.de/english.aspx - English landing page of the association

Public transport in Germany
Transport associations in Germany
1991 establishments in Germany